Rugeley (  or ) is a market town and civil parish in the Cannock Chase District in Staffordshire, England. At the 2021 Census, the population was 24,386. 

Rugeley is twinned with Western Springs, Illinois and, in July 1962, the towns made telephone history on national television when the chairman of Rugeley Urban District Council made the first telephone call via the new Telstar satellite to the Mayor of Western Springs. It was also featured in an article about workers' rights and town transformation in the 21st century.

History

The town, historically known as Rudgeley or Ridgeley, is listed in the Domesday Book of 1086. This name is thought to be derived from 'Ridge lee', or 'the hill over the field'. In the mediaeval period, it thrived on iron workings and was also a site of glass manufacturing.  During the Industrial Revolution the economy of Rugeley benefited from the construction of the Trent and Mersey Canal and then from it becoming a junction on the railway network.

Rugeley was considered royal land and Cannock Chase was considered a royal forest. In 1189, Rugeley was sold to the Bishop of Lichfield and Coventry by King Richard I the Lionheart. Rugeley was still relatively small at this point.

By 1259, Rugeley had grown significantly enough to be granted the right to hold a weekly market. To this day there is a weekly outdoor market held in the town.

In 1532, the manor of Rugeley was inherited by the Chetwynd family who held it until 1764. In 1768, the manor passed to Thomas Anson, later Viscount Anson.

In 1709 Rugeley was hit with two disasters. One was a fire that ravaged the town (the town had been hit by a fire sixty years prior to this too, making this the second such disaster) and the other was when the Rising Brook which runs through the town broke its banks and flooded the town.

Rugeley was an agricultural community for hundreds of years and held regular sheep, cattle and horse fairs. This reached its peak in the mid 19th century and lasting until the 1930s. The Rugeley annual horse fair was known internationally and attracted trade from far and away. To this day there is a main road in Rugeley town centre called Horsefair honouring this, as well as another street honouring the sheep fair.

St. Augustine's Church in Rugeley has memorials to the Levett family, who live at nearby Milford Hall and who established the Rugeley Home and Cottage Hospital on Church Street in 1866.

From 1894 to 1974 the town was administered by Rugeley Urban District Council which was based at Rugeley Town Hall; the town hall was largely demolished in 1978 and all that remains of the building now is the clock tower.

Between 1793 and 1967 Rugeley Grammar School provided selective secondary education for the town and also for Hednesford. Historical characters who were educated at RGS include the banker and railway promoter Edward Charles Blount and the Australian pioneer and politician Charles Bonney.

Although smaller pits had existed beforehand, the town became a centre of industrial scale deep-shaft coal mining from the 1950s, to access similar coal seams to those under Cannock Chase. The Lea Hall Colliery that opened in July 1960 was the first modern coal mine opened by the National Coal Board, which managed the United Kingdom's nationalized coal industry. Nearby the Central Electricity Generating Board built the two Rugeley power stations. With the construction of Rugeley A and B power stations Rugeley became a major centre for electricity generation. These developments led to the town growing very quickly in the 1960s. The Rugeley A power station was designed to take its fuel directly from Lea Hall by conveyor belt (although the coal was of poor quality not suitable for Rugeley B). This was the first such arrangement in Britain. Rugeley power station was shut in 2016 and demolished in stages in 2021.

Climate

Like most of the United Kingdom, Rugeley has an oceanic climate, with warm summers and cool but not extremely cold winters.

Transport

Railway
For many years in the 1970s and 1980s, Rugeley was served by British Rail with four services each way to and from Stafford and Rugby/Coventry. After the closure of Rugeley A power station and Lea Hall Colliery, with the consequential reduction in rail freight, it became possible to open up the Rugeley to Walsall line for passenger traffic. Rugeley now has two railway stations: Rugeley Trent Valley and Rugeley Town.

Rugeley Trent Valley lies on the West Coast Main Line; it has a regular hourly service to London via Lichfield, Nuneaton, Rugby and Milton Keynes, and to Crewe via Stafford and Stoke-on-Trent. Rugeley Trent Valley also has a half-hourly service via Rugeley Town railway station and the Chase Line suburban route connecting to Walsall and Birmingham.

Buses
Regular bus services 63, 826 and 828 link Rugeley to the towns of Stafford, Hednesford and Lichfield. These Chaserider operated routes also link nearby rural villages of Colwich and Great Haywood. They also link the towns neighbourhoods including Springfields, Peartree and Brereton. No buses operate on Sunday or bank holidays.

Canal
The town continues to benefit from the Trent and Mersey Canal on its eastern side which, since the popularity of canals as a leisure activity, brings additional tourism into the town. The canal runs from Preston Brook to Shardlow, through Cheshire, Staffordshire and Derbyshire.

Roads
The major roads into Rugeley are the A460 from Wolverhampton and the A51, via Tamworth, Lichfield to Stone before going through Nantwich and ending at Chester. A new eastern bypass was opened in 2007, to facilitate the development of new employment areas on the former colliery site and to reduce congestion in the town centre.

Media

Television 
BBC Midlands Today and ITV Central cover Rugeley from studios in Birmingham. These are mainly received from the Sutton Coldfield transmitting station; however, some parts of the town are shielded from Sutton Coldfield and rely on the Rugeley relay, located at The Hart School.

Some parts of Rugeley can also receive good signals from the Waltham transmitting station near Melton Mowbray in Leicestershire, which carries BBC East Midlands and the East Midlands variant of ITV Central.

Radio 
Rugeley lies within the coverage areas of the West Midland regional stations, like Heart and Greatest Hits Radio, Capital Mid-Counties and Signal 1 in Stoke-on-Trent. BBC Local Radio is covered by BBC WM from Birmingham on 95.6 FM, though reception is not good and, in some parts, BBC Radio Stoke on 94.6 FM is better received.

The town is covered by Cannock Chase Radio, a community radio station.

Newspapers 
For many years up to 1980, Rugeley had its own newspaper: the Rugeley Times, published from Bow Street. The newspaper was sold to the Staffordshire Newsletter. Today, the town is covered by the Express and Star. A team of students from The Hart School began writing a local newspaper called The Hart of Rugeley; this is now published three times a year.

Demography
In the 2011 census, Rugeley was 96.5% White British. Much of the ageing population and their families are linked to the ex-mining communities, with an increasing proportion of the younger population being new to the area and associated with the services sector. As former mining towns, Rugeley including the Brereton area suffer from a moderate level of social deprivation, with parts of the town consisting of council or ex-council house stock (such as the Springfield Estate and parts of Brereton) or former National Coal Board housing, such as the Pear Tree Estate. However, on the fringes of Rugeley there is more affluence, and some of the older Georgian streets including the conservation area of Crossley Stone or waterfront properties along the Trent and Mersey Canal.  A number of new houses were built in the housing boom of the early 2000s, providing a mixture of affordable and higher-end properties.

Religion

Church of England

The parish church of Rugeley is St Augustine's Church. St Augustine of Canterbury was sent by Pope Gregory the Great in the 6th century to convert the Anglo-Saxon pagans to Christianity. The present church was built in 1822 on the site of a medieval church, part of which still stands in the grounds. The old church now lies in ruins, but there is a school next to it called 'Chancel School' as the chancel of the church is the only part that is mainly intact. There are several other churches within the Rugeley area, including The Church of the Good Shepherd, Rugeley Community Church, Victory Church, The Church of the Holy Spirit and St Michael's Church.

Roman Catholic

The Catholic Church in Rugeley is dedicated to St Joseph and St Etheldreda. It is in the Gothic revival style of the 19th Century and was designed by Charles Hansom and built between 1849 and 1851 out of local stone. There is a Catholic Primary School in the Town dedicated to St Joseph as the Church is. The Parish is part of the Archdiocese of Birmingham.

Methodist

The Methodist church of Rugeley is named after St Paul and located close to the town centre on Lichfield Street. It is a Methodist/ United Reformed Church. Along with the main town centre Methodist church there is also one in the Brereton area of the town.

Amenities
Schools in the area include The Hart School (formerly two separate schools – Fair Oak Academy and Hagley Park Academy).

Rugeley has a modern swimming pool and leisure centre, opened 2006 on Burnthill Lane. Rugeley has a skate park in Hagley Park.

Rugeley's town centre has an outdoor market three days per week on Tuesdays, Thursdays and Saturdays. It also has an indoor market and a shopping centre called the Brewery Street Arcade. Rugeley has a number of well known high street names like Boots, Argos, Greggs, Costa Coffee, McDonald's, Burger King, Subway Restaurant, Tesco and Morrisons among other well known retailers. Along with these main high street retailers there are still a number of smaller Momma & Poppa style shops.

Residents of the town benefit from their proximity to Cannock Chase and indeed there is a heritage trail funded by the National Lottery linking the town to Hednesford with excellent disabled access. The trail contains numerous notice boards highlighting the town's history. The Chase has many activities including hiking, camping, mountain bike trails and the local Go Ape which is located at Birches Valley, Rugeley which is also the centre of both the Forestry Commission and Forest Live outdoor annual concerts.

Rugeley also has a state-of-the-art health centre off Sandy Lane, a replacement for its predecessor on Horsefair. A modern care home now stands on the site of the former surgery. Technically, two separate surgeries coexist there. There is also the Aelfgar Surgery in Taylors Lane. There is also the Springfields Health & Well Being Centre which caters for the Springfield and Etching Hill Areas as well as the Brereton Clinic.

Rugeley Rose Theatre is a theatre and community centre in Taylors Lane.

Sport
Rugeley is home to two cricket clubs (Rugeley C.C. and Trent Valley C.C.), several football clubs and Rugeley Rugby Club.

Rugeley Snooker Club meets in Heron Court Hall.

Rugeley Rifle Club, catering to .22 and air gun target shooting, moved to its current location near the Town Station in 1971 and is noted for member Victoria Bradbury, bronze medallist at the 2018 ISSF World Shooting Championships.

The Lea Hall Social Club, which underwent extensive renovation between 2005 and 2011, serves Rugeley residents with a variety of facilities including cricket and football pitches, a crown bowling green. There used to be tennis courts, but they are now gone and replaced with housing.

Etching Hill Tennis Club has offered casual and competitive hard court play to members since 1952.

Hawkesyard Golf (formerly known as the St. Thomas Priory Golf Course) is to the east of the town on the Hawkesyard Estate.

Events
The town council also puts on a fireworks display during the last weekend of the school summer holidays, known as "Back to School with a Bang". A Christmas lights switch-on during December includes a market and late-night opening of shops, with the local traders association joining in the organising of street entertainment.

A Pagan conference happens on the May bank holiday every year. Staffordshire Pagan Conference started in 2015 and was held at Lea Hall Social Club. The conference is attended by over 250 people from all over the country. Over £1,000 has been donated to Staffordshire Wildlife Trust with the profit from the event. As of 2018 the conference relocated to The Rose Theatre and become Witchfest Midlands.

In 2016 and 2017, the British Quidditch Cup was held at Rugeley Leisure Centre. The third British Quidditch Cup took place on 19 and 20 March 2016, with 32 teams competing, and the winners were Oxford's team, the Radcliffe Chimeras. The fourth British Quidditch Cup took place on 11 and 12 March 2017, with 32 teams competing, and the winners were Velociraptors QC.

In February 2020 a new "Fringe Festival" was announced with a variety of events intended to be held in the town over the May Bank Holiday. The Festival was cancelled in March due to the COVID-19 pandemic.

Cannock Chase is a venue for the Forest Live series of music events, with concerts held at Birches Valley Forest Centre, Rugeley. As with other Forest Live events it hosts different live acts from big name bands each year. Past acts have included Paul Weller, UB40, Kaiser Chiefs and Paloma Faith.

Future
Rugeley suffered an increase in unemployment when Lea Hall Colliery closed in 1990. Following many years of demolition and regeneration, a number of large industrial units have been built on the Towers Business Park, a brownfield site situated on the former ground of the colliery. In August 2011, Amazon.co.uk opened a 700,000 sq ft fulfillment centre on the Towers Park, creating between 700 and 900 full-time jobs as well as generating a large pool of seasonal work around Christmas.

Rugeley's future looks set to benefit from the recent closure and demolition of the power station. The Brownfields site will be developed. This development has been earmarked to include 2,300 new homes as well as housing for the elderly. There will be a new All through school; the first in Staffordshire, which will accommodate 1,400 pupils. There will be over 12 acres used for employment as well as a riverside country park and a new water sports leisure facility at the Borrow Pit Lake. There will also be added commercial development to the area. This new development will be a massive boost to the area and the whole new development will be low carbon.

Notable people
 Thomas Weston (1584–1646) Merchant adventurer, admitted to the Worshipful Company of Ironmongers in 1609
 Mary Knowles (1733–1807), English Quaker poet, supported abolition of the slave trade and slavery.
 John Stevenson Salt (1777–1845) English barrister, banker and land owner, served as High Sheriff of Staffordshire in 1838
 William Palmer (1824–1856), murderer
 Thomas George Bonney FRS (1833–1923) English geologist, president of the Geological Society of London
 John Porter (1838–1922) English thoroughbred flat racing trainer, founder of Newbury Racecourse
 Frederic Bonney FRS (1842–1921) British land owner, photographer and anthropologist
 Ethelred Luke Taunton (1857–1907) English Roman Catholic priest and historical writer.
 Selwyn MacGregor Grier (1878–1946) was a British colonial administrator, Governor-in-Chief of the Windward Islands from 1935 to 1937.
 Lynda Grier (1880–1967) was a British educational administrator and policy advisor
 William Beaumont Burns (1883–1916) English cricketer, played more than 200 first-class matches mainly for Worcestershire. 
 Wilfred John Simkin CMG (1883–1967) was the 6th Anglican Bishop of Auckland
 Sir Nicholas Raymond Winterton (born 1938) British Conservative Party politician, MP for Macclesfield 1971 / 2015
 Paul Davies-Hale (born 1962) British long-distance runner, competed in the 1984 Summer Olympics in the 3000m steeplechase and at 1992 Summer Olympics in the marathon
Scout Niblett (born 20 September 1973) Singer-Songwriter-Musician.
Robert Rock (born 6 April 1977) is an English professional golfer. He has played on the European Tour since 2003. 
George Pilkington (born 7 November 1981) is an English former professional footballer.

Nearby towns and cities

Villages

Other

Twin town 
Rugeley is twinned with:

 Western Springs, Illinois

See also
Listed buildings in Rugeley

References

External links
 Rugeley Town Council
 Brereton and Rugeley Parish Website

 
Towns in Staffordshire
Cannock Chase District